Thornhill Lees is a district of Dewsbury, which is a town within the borough of Kirklees in the county of West Yorkshire, England. The district lies to the south of Dewsbury Town Centre, between Savile Town and Thornhill. Thornhill Lees is served by two schools: Thornhill Lees Infant & Nursery School and Headfield Junior School. It is also consisted of the ‘Saint Anne’s House’ 

Hector Munro Chadwick, a philologist, was born in Thornhill Lees.

References

Populated places in West Yorkshire
Geography of Dewsbury